The US Sailor of the Year Awards are presented every year by the United States Sailing Association to one male and one female winner since 1961. They are considered the sport’s ultimate recognition of an individual’s outstanding on-the-water achievements for the calendar year in the United States.

Since 1980, the awards are sponsored by Rolex and named US Sailing’s Rolex Yachtsman and Yachtswoman of the Year Awards

History 
List of winners:

References

External links 
 Official website

 
Awards established in 1961
American sports trophies and awards